New Year is the time or day at which a new calendar year begins and the calendar's year count increments by one. Many cultures celebrate the event in some manner. In the Gregorian calendar, the most widely used calendar system today, New Year occurs on January 1 (New Year's Day, preceded by New Year's Eve). This was also the first day of the year in the original Julian calendar and the Roman calendar (after 153 BC).

Other cultures observe their traditional or religious New Year's Day according to their own customs, typically (though not invariably) because they use a lunar calendar or a lunisolar calendar. Chinese New Year, the Islamic New Year, Tamil New Year (Puthandu), and the Jewish New Year are among well-known examples. India, Nepal, and other countries also celebrate New Year on dates according to their own calendars that are movable in the Gregorian calendar.

During the Middle Ages in Western Europe, while the Julian calendar was still in use, authorities moved New Year's Day, depending upon locale, to one of several other days, including March 1, March 25, Easter, September 1, and December 25.  Since then, many national civil calendars in the Western World and beyond have changed to using one fixed date for New Year's Day, January 1most doing so when they adopted the Gregorian calendar.

By month or season

January

January 1: The first day of the civil year in the Gregorian calendar used by most countries.
Contrary to common belief in the west, the civil New Year of January 1 is not an Orthodox Christian religious holiday. The Eastern Orthodox liturgical calendar makes no provision for the observance of a New Year. January 1 is itself a religious holiday, but that is because it is the feast of the circumcision of Christ (seven days after His birth), and a commemoration of saints. While the liturgical calendar begins September 1, there is also no particular religious observance attached to the start of the new cycle. Orthodox nations may, however, make civil celebrations for the New Year. Those who adhere to the revised Julian calendar (which synchronizes dates with the Gregorian calendar), including Bulgaria, Cyprus, Egypt, Greece, Romania, Syria, and Turkey, observe both the religious and civil holidays on January 1. In other nations and locations where Orthodox churches still adhere to the Julian calendar, including Georgia, Israel, Russia, the Republic of Macedonia, Serbia, Montenegro, and Ukraine, the civil new year is observed on January 1 of the civil calendar, while those same religious feasts occur on January 14 Gregorian (which is January 1 Julian), in accord with the liturgical calendar.
The Japanese New Year (正月, Shōgatsu) is currently celebrated on January 1, with the holiday usually being observed until the January 3, while other sources say that Shōgatsu lasts until January 6. In 1873, five years after the Meiji Restoration, Japan adopted the Gregorian calendar. Prior to 1873, Japan used a lunar calendar with twelve months each of 29 or 30 days for a total year of about 354 days.
The Sámi celebrated Ođđajagemánnu.

Lunar New Year

The Chinese New Year, also known as Spring Festival or Lunar New Year, occurs every year on the new moon of the first lunar month, about the beginning of spring (Lichun). The exact date can fall any time between January 21 and February 21 (inclusive) of the Gregorian Calendar. Traditionally, years were marked by one of twelve Earthly Branches, represented by an animal, and one of ten Heavenly Stems, which correspond to the five elements. This combination cycles every 60 years. It is the most important Chinese celebration of the year.
The Korean New Year is a Seollal or Lunar New Year's Day. Although January 1 is, in fact, the first day of the year, Seollal, the first day of the lunar calendar, is more meaningful for Koreans. A celebration of the Lunar New Year is believed to have started to let in good luck and ward off bad spirits all throughout the year. With the old year out and a new one in, people gather at home and sit around with their families and relatives, catching up on what they have been doing.
The Vietnamese New Year is the Tết Nguyên Đán which most times is the same day as the Chinese New Year due to the Vietnamese using a Lunar calendar similar to the Chinese calendar.
The Tibetan New Year is Losar and falls between January and March.

March
Babylonian New Year began with the first New Moon after the northward equinox.  Ancient celebrations lasted for eleven days.
Nava Varsha is celebrated in India in various regions from March–April.
The Iranian New Year, called Nowruz, is the day containing the exact moment of the Northward equinox, which usually occurs on March 20 or 21, marking the start of the spring season. The Zoroastrian New Year coincides with the Iranian New Year of Nowruz and is celebrated by the Parsis in India and by Zoroastrians and Persians across the world. In the Baháʼí calendar, the new year occurs on the vernal equinox on March 20 or 21 and is called Naw-Rúz. The Iranian tradition was also passed on to Central Asian countries, including Kazakhs, Uzbeks, and Uighurs, and there is known as Nauryz. It is usually celebrated on March 22.
The Balinese New Year, based on the Saka Calendar (Balinese-Javanese Calendar), is called Nyepi, and it falls on Bali's Lunar New Year (around March). It is a day of silence, fasting, and meditation: observed from 6 AM until 6 AM the next morning, Nyepi is a day reserved for self-reflection and as such, anything that might interfere with that purpose is restricted. Although Nyepi is a primarily Hindu holiday, non-Hindu residents of Bali observe the day of silence as well, out of respect for their fellow citizens. Even tourists are not exempt; although free to do as they wish inside their hotels, no one is allowed onto the beaches or streets, and the only airport in Bali remains closed for the entire day. The only exceptions granted are for emergency vehicles carrying those with life-threatening conditions and women about to give birth. The Javanese people also celebrate their Satu Suro on this day.
Ugadi; the Telugu and Kannada New Year, generally falls in the months of March or April. The people of Andhra Pradesh, Telangana and Karnataka states in southern India celebrate the advent of New Year's Day in these months. The first month of the new year is Chaitra Masa.
In the Kashmiri calendar, the holiday Navreh marks the New Year in March–April. This holy day of Kashmiri Brahmins has been celebrated for several millennia.
Gudi Padwa is celebrated as the first day of the Hindu year by the people of Maharashtra, India and Sanskar Padwa is celebrated in Goa. This day falls in March–April and coincides with Ugadi. (see: Deccan)
The Sindhi festival of Cheti Chand is celebrated on the same day as Ugadi/Gudi Padwa to mark the celebration of the Sindhi New Year.
The Thelemic New Year on March 20 (or on April 8 by some accounts) is usually celebrated with an invocation to Ra-Hoor-Khuit, commemorating the beginning of the New Aeon in 1904. It also marks the start of the twenty-two-day Thelemic holy season, which ends on the third day of the writing of The Book of the Law. This date is also known as The Feast of the Supreme Ritual. There are some that believe the Thelemic New Year falls on either March 19, 20, or 21, depending on the vernal equinox, which is The Feast for the Equinox of the Gods on the vernal equinox of each year to commemorate the founding of Thelema in 1904. In 1904 the vernal equinox was on March 21, and it was the day after Aleister Crowley ended his Horus Invocation that brought on the new Æon and Thelemic New Year.

April
The Chaldean-Babylonian New Year, called Kha b'Nissan or Resha d'Sheeta, occurs on April 1.
Thelemic New Year Celebrations usually end on April 10, after an approximately one-month-long period that begins on March 20 (the formal New Year). This one-month period is referred to by many as the High Holy Days, and end with periods of observance on April 8, 9, and 10, coinciding with the three days of the Writing of the Book of the Law by Aleister Crowley in 1904.

Mid-April (Spring in the Northern Hemisphere)

The new year of many South and Southeast Asian calendars falls between April 13–15, marking the beginning of spring.
The Baloch Hindu people in Pakistan and India celebrate their new year called Bege Roch in the month of Daardans according to their Saaldar calendar.
Tamil New Year ( Puthandu) is celebrated in the South Indian state of Tamil Nadu, on the first of Chithrai (சித்திரை) (April 13, 14, or 15). In the temple city of Madurai, the Chithrai Thiruvizha is celebrated in the Meenakshi Temple. A huge exhibition is also held, called Chithrai Porutkaatchi. In some parts of Southern Tamil Nadu, it is also called Chithrai Vishu. The day is marked with a feast in Hindu homes and the entrance to the houses are decorated elaborately with kolams.
Punjabi/Sikh Vaisakhi (ਵਿਸਾਖੀ) is celebrated on April 14 in Punjab according to their nanakshahi calendar.
Nepal New Year in Nepal is celebrated on the 1st of Baisakh Baisākh which falls on 12–15 April in the Gregorian calendar. Nepal follows the Bikram Sambat (BS) as an official calendar.
The Dogra of Himachal Pradesh celebrate their new year Chaitti in the month of Chaitra.
Maithili New Year or Jude-Sheetal too fall on these days. It is celebrated by Maithili People all around the world.
Assamese New Year (Rongali Bihu or Bohag Bihu) is celebrated on April 14 or 15 in the Indian state of Assam.
Bengali New Year ( Pôhela Boishakh or  Bangla Nôbobôrsho) is celebrated on the 1st of Boishakh (April 14 or 15) in Bangladesh and the Indian state of West Bengal and Tripura.
Odia New Year (Vishuva Sankranti) is celebrated on April 14 in the Indian state of Odisha. It is also called Vishuva Sankranti or Pana Sankranti (ପଣା ସଂକ୍ରାନ୍ତି).
Manipuri New Year or Cheirouba is celebrated on April 14 in the Indian State of Manipur with much festivities and feasting.
Sinhalese New Year is celebrated with the harvest festival (in the month of Bak) when the sun moves from the Meena Rashiya (House of Pisces) to the Mesha Rashiya (House of Aries). Sri Lankans begin celebrating their National New Year "Aluth Avurudda (අලුත් අවුරුද්ද)" in Sinhala and "Puththandu (புத்தாண்டு)" in Tamil. However, unlike the usual practice where the new year begins at midnight, the National New Year begins at the time determined by the astrologers by calculating the exact time that sun goes from  Meena Rashiya (House of Pisces) to the Mesha Rashiya (House of Aries). Not only the beginning of the new year but the conclusion of the old year is also specified by the astrologers. And unlike the customary ending and beginning of the new year, there is a period of a few hours in between the conclusion of the Old Year and the commencement of the New Year, which is called the "nona gathe" (neutral period) Where part of the sun in House of Pisces and Part is in House of Aries.
Malayali New Year (Vishu) is celebrated in the South Indian state of Kerala in mid-April.
Western parts of Karnataka where Tulu is spoken, the new year is celebrated along with Tamil/ Malayali New year April 14 or 15, although in other parts most commonly celebrated on the day of Gudi Padwa, the Maharashtrian new year. In Kodagu, in Southwestern Karnataka, however, both new year, Yugadi (corresponding to Gudi Padwa in March) and Bisu (corresponding to Vishu in around April 14 or 15), are observed.
The Water Festival is the form of similar new year celebrations taking place in many Southeast Asian countries, on the day of the full moon of the 11th month on the lunisolar calendar each year. The date of the festival is based on the traditional lunisolar calendar which determines the dates of Buddhist festivals and holidays, and is observed from April 13 to 15. Traditionally people gently sprinkled water on one another as a sign of respect, but since the new year falls during the hottest month in Southeast Asia, many people end up dousing strangers and passersby in vehicles in boisterous celebration. The festival has many different names specific to each country:
In Burma it is known as Thingyan
 Songkran in Thailand
 Pi Mai Lao ( Songkan) in Laos
 Chaul Chnam Thmey in Cambodia.
 It is also the traditional new year of the Dai peoples of Yunnan Province, China. Religious activities in the tradition of Theravada Buddhism are also carried out, a tradition in which all of these cultures share.

June
 The New Year of the Kutchi people occurs on Ashadi Beej, that is 2nd day of Shukla paksha of Aashaadha month of Hindu calendar. As for people of Kutch, this day is associated with the beginning of rains in Kutch, which is largely a desert area. Hindu calendar month of Aashaadh usually begins on June 22 and ending on July 22.
 Odunde Festival is a celebration on the 2nd Sunday of June, where "Odunde" means "Happy New Year" in the Yorube Nigerian language.
The Xooy ceremony of the Serer people of Senegal, Gambia and Mauritania marks the Serer New Year.
In the Dogon religion, the Bulo festival marks the Dogon New Year.

July
 The New Year of the Zulu people occurs on the full moon of July.

September
 Neyrouz, the Coptic New Year, is the continuation of the ancient Egyptian New Year following the Roman emperor Augustus's reform of its calendar. Its date of Thoth 1 usually occurs on August 29 in the Julian calendar, except in the year before a Julian leap year, when it occurs the next day. The leap years removed from the Gregorian calendar mean that it presently falls on September 11 or 12 but on different days before 1900 or after 2100.
 Enkutatash, the Ethiopian New Year, occurs on the same day as Neyrouz.
 The New Year of the French Revolutionary Calendar, in force from 1793 to 1805 and briefly under the Paris Commune in 1871, occurred on the Southward equinox (22, 23, or 24 September)

Autumn in the Northern Hemisphere
Rosh Hashanah (Hebrew for 'head of the year') is a Jewish, two day holiday, commemorating the culmination of the seven days of Creation, and marking God's yearly renewal of His world. The day has elements of festivity and introspection, as God is traditionally believed to be assessing His creation and determining the fate of all men and creatures for the coming year. In Jewish tradition, honey is used to symbolize a sweet new year. At the traditional meal for that holiday, apple slices are dipped in honey and eaten with blessings recited for a good, sweet new year. Some Rosh Hashanah greetings show honey and an apple, symbolizing the feast. In some congregations, small straws of honey are given out to usher in the new year.
The Pathans Kalasha celebrate their Chowmus which marks the beginning of their year in Chitral district of Pakistan and parts of India.
The Marwari New Year (Thapna) is celebrated on the day of the festival of Diwali, which is the last day Krishna Paksha of the Ashvin month & also the last day of the Ashvin month of the Hindu calendar.
The Gujarati New Year (Bestu/Nao Varas) is celebrated the day after the festival of Diwali (which occurs in mid-fall – either October or November, depending on the Lunar calendar). The Gujarati New Year is synonymous with sud ekam, i.e. first day of Shukla paksha of the Kartik month, which is taken as the first day of the first month of the Gujarati lunar calendar. Most other Hindus celebrate the New Year in early spring. The Gujarati community all over the world celebrates the New Year after Diwali to mark the beginning of a new fiscal year.
The Sikkimese celebrate their new year called Losar.
The Nepal Era New year (see Nepal Sambat) is celebrated in regions encompassing original Nepal. The new year occurs on the fourth day of Diwali. The calendar was used as an official calendar until the mid-19th century. However, the new year is still celebrated by the Newars community of  Nepal.
Some neo-pagans celebrate their interpretation of Samhain (a festival of the ancient Celts, held around November 1) as a New Year's Day representing the new cycle of the Wheel of the Year, although they do not use a different calendar that starts on this day.

December 
 The Mizo in northeast India celebrate their Pawl Kut in December.
 The Inuit, the Aleut, the Yupik, the Chukchi and the Iñupiat celebrate Quviasukvik as their New Year. It occurs on the same day as Christmas Eve.

Variable

 The Islamic New Year occurs on Muharram. Since the Islamic calendar is based on 12 lunar months amounting to about 354 days, its New Year occurs about eleven days earlier each year in relation to the Gregorian calendar, with two Islamic New Years falling in the Gregorian year 2008.
 The "Opening of the Year", usually transcribed as Wep Renpet, was the ancient Egyptian New Year. It appears to have originally been set to occur upon Sirius's return to the night sky (July 19 proleptic Julian calendar), during the initial stages of former annual flood of the Nile. However the Egyptian calendar's lack of leap years, until its reform by the Roman emperor Augustus, meant that the celebration slowly cycled through the entire solar year over the course of two or three 1460-year Sothic cycles.

Christian liturgical year

The early development of the Christian liturgical year coincided with the Roman Empire (east and west), and later the Byzantine Empire, both of which employed a taxation system labeled the Indiction, the years for which began on September 1. This timing may account for the ancient church's establishment of September 1 as the beginning of the liturgical year, despite the official Roman New Year's Day of January 1 in the Julian calendar, because the Indiction was the principal means for counting years in the empires, apart from the reigns of the Emperors. The September 1 date prevailed throughout all of Christendom for many centuries, until subsequent divisions eventually produced revisions in some places.

After the sack of Rome in 410, communications and travel between east and west deteriorated. Liturgical developments in Rome and Constantinople did not always match, although a rigid adherence to form was never mandated in the church. Nevertheless, the principal points of development were maintained between east and west. The Roman and Constantinopolitan liturgical calendars remained compatible even after the East-West Schism in 1054. Separations between the Catholic General Roman Calendar and Eastern Orthodox liturgical calendar grew only over several centuries' time. During those intervening centuries, the Latin Church Catholic ecclesiastic year was moved to the first day of Advent, the Sunday nearest to St. Andrew's Day (November 30). By the time of the Reformation (early 16th century), the Roman Catholic general calendar provided the initial basis for the calendars for the liturgically-oriented Protestants, including the Anglican and Lutheran Churches, who inherited this observation of the liturgical new year.

The present-day Eastern Orthodox liturgical calendar is the virtual culmination of the ancient eastern development cycle, though it includes later additions based on subsequent history and lives of saints. It still begins on September 1, proceeding annually into the Nativity of the Theotokos (September 8) and Exaltation of the Cross (September 14) to the celebration of Nativity of Christ (Christmas), through his death and resurrection (Pascha/Easter), to his Ascension and the Dormition of the Theotokos ("falling asleep" of the Virgin Mary, August 15). This last feast is known in the Roman Catholic church as the Assumption. The dating of "September 1" is according to the "new" (revised) Julian calendar or the "old" (standard) Julian calendar, depending on which is used by a particular Orthodox Church. Hence, it may fall on September 1 on the civil calendar, or on September 14 (between 1900 and 2099 inclusive).

The liturgical calendars of the Coptic and Ethiopian Orthodox churches are unrelated to these systems but instead follow the Alexandrian calendar which fixed the wandering ancient Egyptian calendar to the Julian year. Their New Year celebrations on Neyrouz and Enkutatash were fixed; however, at a point in the Sothic cycle close to the Indiction; between the years 1900 and 2100, they fall on September 11 during most years and September 12 in the years preceding a leap year.

Historical European new year dates
During the Roman Republic and the Roman Empire, years began on the date on which each consul first entered the office. This was probably May 1 before 222 BC, March 15 from 222 BC to 154 BC, and January 1 from 153 BC. In 45 BC, when Julius Caesar's new Julian calendar took effect, the Senate fixed January 1 as the first day of the year. At that time, this was the date on which those who were to hold civil office assumed their official position, and it was also the traditional annual date for the convening of the Roman Senate. This civil new year remained in effect throughout the Roman Empire, east and west, during its lifetime and well after, wherever the Julian calendar continued in use.

In England, the Angle, Saxon, and Viking invasions of the fifth through tenth centuries plunged the region back into pre-history for a time. While the reintroduction of Christianity brought the Julian calendar with it, its use was primarily in the service of the church to begin with. After William the Conqueror became king in 1066, he ordered that January 1 be re-established as the civil New Year to coincide with his coronation. From about 1155, England and Scotland joined much of Europe to celebrate the New Year on March 25, falling in line with the rest of Christendom.

In the Middle Ages in Europe a number of significant feast days in the ecclesiastical calendar of the Roman Catholic Church came to be used as the beginning of the Julian year:

 In Modern Style or Circumcision Style dating, the new year started on January 1, the  Feast of the Circumcision of Christ.
 In  Annunciation Style or Lady Day Style dating the new year started on March 25, the feast of the Annunciation (traditionally nicknamed Lady Day). This date was used in many parts of Europe during the Middle Ages and beyond.
 Scotland changed to Modern Style new year dating on January 1, 1600, by Order of the King's Privy Council on December 17, 1599. Despite the unification of the Scottish and English royal crowns with the accession of King James VI and I in 1603, and even the union of the kingdoms themselves in 1707, England continued using March 25 until after Parliament passed the Calendar (New Style) Act of 1750. This act converted all of Great Britain to use of the Gregorian calendar and simultaneously redefined the civil new year to January 1 (as in Scotland). It went into effect on 3 September (Old Style or 14September New Style) 1752. 
 In Easter Style dating, the new year started on Holy Saturday (the day before Easter),  or sometimes on Good Friday. This was used all over Europe, but especially in France, from the eleventh to the sixteenth century. A disadvantage of this system was that because Easter was a movable feast the same date could occur twice in a year; the two occurrences were distinguished as "before Easter" and "after Easter".
 In Christmas Style or Nativity Style dating the new year started on December 25. This was used in Germany and England until the eleventh century, and in Spain from the fourteenth to the sixteenth century.

Southward equinox day (usually September 22) was "New Year's Day" in the French Republican Calendar, which was in use from 1793 to 1805. This was primidi Vendémiaire, the first day of the first month.

Adoptions of January 1

It took quite a long time before January 1 again became the universal or standard start of the civil year. The years of adoption of January 1 as the new year are as follows:

March 1 was the first day of the numbered year in the Republic of Venice until its destruction in 1797, and in Russia from 988 until 1492 (Anno Mundi 7000 in the Byzantine calendar). September 1 was used in Russia from 1492 (A.M. 7000) until the adoption of the Anno Domini notation in 1700 via a December 1699 decree of Tsar Peter I.

Time zones
Because of the division of the globe into time zones, the new year moves progressively around the globe as the start of the day ushers in the New Year. The first time zone to usher in the New Year, just west of the International Date Line, is located in the Line Islands, a part of the nation of Kiribati, and has a time zone 14 hours ahead of UTC. All other time zones are 1 to 25 hours behind, most in the previous day (December 31); on American Samoa and Midway, it is still 11 PM on December 30. These are among the last inhabited places to observe New Year. However, uninhabited outlying US territories Howland Island and Baker Island are designated as lying within the time zone 12 hours behind UTC, the last places on earth to see the arrival of January 1. These small coral islands are found about midway between Hawaii and Australia, about 1,000 miles west of the Line Islands. This is because the International Date Line is a composite of local time zone arrangements, which winds through the Pacific Ocean, allowing each locale to remain most closely connected in time with the nearest or largest or most convenient political and economic locales with which each associate. By the time Howland Island sees the new year, it is 2 AM on January 2 in the Line Islands of Kiribati.

See also

New Year's Eve
Baby New Year
Hogmanay
Nogbon
Twelve Grapes
Old New Year (or Orthodox New Year, Julian New Year)
Assyrian New Year
Aztec New Year
Berber New Year
Cambodian New Year
Chinese New Year
Ethiopian New Year
Indian New Year's days
Islamic New Year
Japanese New Year
Jewish New Year
Korean New Year
Lunar New Year
Māori New Year
Mongolian New Year
Pahela Baishakh
Pakistani New Year
Persian New Year
Russian New Year
Sinhalese New Year
Thai New Year
Vietnamese New Year
Old Style and New Style dates
List of films set around New Year

Notes

References

Sources

External links

Calendars
 
Kigo